Stuart Neil Luke Murphy (born 6 November 1971 in Leeds), is the Chief Executive of the English National Opera. He was educated at St Mary's School, Menston and Clare College, Cambridge.

From 2012 - 2015, he was Director, Entertainment Channels at Sky overseeing Sky 1, Sky Living, Sky Arts and the launch of Sky Atlantic. Sky won its first Emmy Awards and Oscar nominations as well as BAFTAs, British Comedy Awards and Royal Television Society Awards during this period. Murphy also had responsibility for Sky Arts, which as well as a channel is an on-demand library of arts and cultural content in Europe.

In 2003 Murphy launched BBC Three and commissioned Little Britain, Gavin and Stacey and Flashmob The Opera. Before BBC Three, he was Channel Controller of BBC Choice, and previously he ran UK Play, a music and comedy channel co-owned by BBC Worldwide.

Previously a board member of the A&E Networks International, and Silicon-Valley based Jaunt Virtual Reality Company. He was made a Fellow of the Royal Television Society in 2016.

Under Murphy the ENO aims to broaden the appeal of opera and mix up the age, ethnicity, and social background of the audience at the ENO.

As a teenager, he played clarinet for the Leeds Youth Orchestra and Leeds Youth Opera.

Early and personal life
Stuart grew up in Leeds, where his passion for classical music was sparked by playing the clarinet in Leeds Youth Orchestra and Leeds Youth Opera.

He attended St. Mary's Menston in West Yorkshire.  He studied Political Geography at Clare College, Cambridge in 1990. He has two sons with his ex-wife. He is openly gay and first spoke publicly about his sexual orientation in a 2012 interview.

His partner, David Clews is Creative Director of TwoFour, and directed the BAFTA-award-winning Educating Essex.

Career
He started his career as a tea boy at BBC Manchester working in DEF II programming.  He then worked on shows such as Reportage, The Sunday Show, Fist of fun, and Lifeswaps with Paul O'Grady.  He later worked as a producer at MTV on Hanging Out with Davina McCall, and at the Big Breakfast. He re-joined the BBC to work for Jane Root in the Independent Commissioning Group, and later developed Radio One TV for Roly Keating, on UKTV.

He launched and ran UK Play, a music and comedy channel owned by UKTV from 1998.

In 2016 Murphy was made a Fellow of the Royal Television Society.

BBC Choice
He joined BBC Choice, the BBC's forerunner to BBC Three, becoming Head of Programmes in 2000, and then Controller.

BBC Three
Became the first channel controller of BBC Three, which launched in February 2003. He commissioned comedies including Little Britain (which had been originally commissioned by BBC Radio 4), Pulling, and Early Doors as well as various dramas including Torchwood, and Conviction.  He kickstarted parenting programming on TV, with Who Rules The Roost, Honey, We're Killing The Kids, Little Angels and The House of Tiny Tearaways both presented by Tanya Byron. Other commissioned shows included Flashmob The Opera (a live opera from Paddington station) and Flashmob The Opera: Meadowhall.

He was tipped as an outsider in the running for the controllership of BBC One in 2007. In 2004 The Observer included Murphy in a list of 80 young people who they believed would shape people's lives in the early 21st Century.

Commercial Broadcasters
After BBC Three he joined RDF Media in 2006 where he stayed for 11 weeks.

Between 2006 and 2008, he was the Creative Director of Twofour Broadcast.

Sky1
He joined Sky1 in May 2009 and commissioned a variety of drama, entertainment, and factual programmes including Got to Dance, Must Be the Music, A League of Their Own, Terry Pratchett's Going Postal, Strike Back, Mad Dogs, The Runaway, Little Crackers, Ross Kemp: Middle East Special, Pineapple Dance Studios, Louie Spence's Showbusiness, An Idiot Abroad, Trollied, Mount Pleasant, Spy, Stella, Starlings, among many others.

Sky Atlantic
In November 2010 he was made Director of Commissioning across all Sky Entertainment channels. He was also given responsibility for launching Sky Atlantic, a new entertainment channel which is the home of the majority of HBO content in the UK. He bought Mad Men (previously at the BBC), Entourage (previously at ITV) as well as Blue Bloods and The Borgias. He commissioned screenwriter Paul Abbott to make Sky Atlantic's first drama, Hit & Miss, starring Chloë Sevigny, commissioned cult comedy This is Jinsy, brought Alan Partridge back to TV, commissioned Kathy Burke's Walking and Talking, Julia Davis's new comedy Hunderby, as well as documentary Flying Monsters with David Attenborough.

Sky Atlantic launched on 1 February 2011.

In May 2012, he was made Director of Entertainment Channels at Sky, overseeing all of the entertainment and commissioning portfolio.

In November 2015, he made the decision to leave Sky to pursue more creative endeavours, he has signed a deal to develop his own scripts with Sky Vision.

English National Opera
In March 2018, Stuart was appointed Chief Executive of the English National Opera, where he joins Annilese Miskimmon (joined 2020) and Martyn Brabbins on ENO's leadership team.

Free tickets scheme

As part of Murphy's 'seismic' mission to attract a younger audience to ENO, in December 2018 he announced free tickets for under-18s on Friday and Saturday nights in the balcony of the London Coliseum. He saw cost as a 'barrier to entry for under-18s" and by removing it helped to promote the idea that opera is not "elitist".

In May 2021, ENO's free tickets initiative was extended to under-21s for every night of the week and was not limited to specific seating, even "the most expensive stall seats".

Additionally, the discount has now been extended to under-35s, who are able to get some of the best seats in the opera for £35 and under by having an under 35 membership.

Controversy

His position at ENO has not been without criticism. In an article attacking ENO's 2019 decision to limit reviewers to a single free ticket as "morally wrong", opera critic Norman Lebrecht said Murphy "makes his predecessors seem reasoned and adept. He maintains you don’t have to know anything about opera in order to run an opera house. The damage of his thoughtless actions is already evident and the consequences may be lasting".

References

External links
 Guardian July 2009
 Guardian interview October 2007
 Times November 2005
 Independent October 2005
 BBC South Yorkshire 2005 interview
 BAFTA Guru Video Interview
 Official Channel Website Sky1
 Official Channel Website Sky Atlantic

1971 births
Alumni of Clare College, Cambridge
BBC executives
BBC Three controllers
English television executives
English television producers
Gay businessmen
English LGBT businesspeople
LGBT television producers
Living people
People educated at St. Mary's Catholic High School, Menston